Bothriomyrmex salsurae is a species of ant in the genus Bothriomyrmex. Described by Donisthorpe in 1944, the species is endemic to Algeria.

References

Bothriomyrmex
Hymenoptera of Africa
Insects of North Africa
Insects described in 1944